= Chicago World's Fair =

Chicago World's Fair may refer to:

- World's Columbian Exposition of 1893, held primarily in Jackson Park on the South Side
- Century of Progress Exposition of 1933, held primarily on Northerly Island near downtown
